German Mills is a community within the city of Markham in Ontario, Canada. The easternmost community in the historic town of Thornhill, German Mills was named for the early German settlers in the area.

History

German Mills is closely associated with the founding of Toronto, then called "Muddy York", and with the early history of Markham, previously called "Mannheim" ("the home of man").

German Mills was part of Lieutenant Governor John Graves Simcoe's plan to establish a bulwark against a possible American invasion. At the time, there was a critical need to find settlers for the province, while at the same time building the capital of York and surrounding areas. Simcoe favoured settlements where military township grants allowed soldiers to act as consumers for local markets and town centres.

In 1793, German Mills was an agricultural settlement, supplying food for its citizens and the military when Toronto was little more than an outpost in the wilderness.

When William Moll Berczy led a group of 64 families (182 people) to old York County in the summer of 1794, German Mills became the first significant industrial complex in Markham Township. Berczy was a multi-talented entrepreneur with leadership, architectural, engineering and painting skills. His group consisted of bakers, blacksmiths, carpenters, shoemakers, weavers, a preacher, a school teacher, a brewer, a cartwright, a locksmith, a miller, a potter, a tanner, stonemasons and farmers. At the time, both Toronto and Markham were surrounded by a thick, mature forest of pine, oak, maple and butternut trees, which were ideal for lumber.

In the fall of 1794, William Berczy hired men to erect a large house and a sawmill at what is now German Mills. To bring prosperity and new settlers, a warehouse for the Northwest Fur Trade Company was constructed at what later became Unionville, Ontario. It served as an intermediate stop for the northern fur trade route on the Nin (Rouge River).

An agreement between Andrew Pierce and the German Land Company, signed and dated January 1, 1793, supplied oxen and cattle from Connecticut to both the town of York and to German Mills. They were sent prior to the arrival of the first settler groups, in 1794. In November, 1794, some of the oxen kept at the German Land Company warehouse, located at the southeast corner of present King and Sherbourne Streets in the town of York, were used in the construction of Yonge Street, now the world's longest street. Other oxen and cattle were shipped to German Mills in flat-bottomed boats up the Don River and then via its tributary, German Mills Creek. At the time, both rivers had a larger water flow.

The German Mills industrial complex consisted of a grist mill, which produced super-fine flour, a sawmill and a blacksmith's forge. The sawmill produced shingles and lumber for the buildings in the German Mills area and for the first houses in Toronto, notably Russell Abbey, the home of the Hon. Peter Russell, Administrator of Upper Canada on Palace Street in 1797. This house established William Moll Berczy's reputation as an architect. He is known today as the "Founder of Markham" and "Co-Founder of Toronto".

Six years later, when it became apparent that water-power produced by the Don River was insufficient to operate the mills, the German Mills industrial complex went into decline.

Zoning

German Mills is now primarily a residential neighbourhood. Most homes are single-family residences, many built in the 1970s and 1980s. Area commuters rely heavily on cars, but the York Region Transit does offer bus services.

Parks

The few parks in the neighbourhood bear the names of settlers and of settlements:

 German Mills Settlers Park – a  site used for sand aggregate extraction (1940s–1960s) and Sabiston Landfill (1960–1975).
 Berczy Park
 Bishop Cross Park

The German Mills Community Centre is a former schoolhouse (S.S.  2 ), one of the few surviving schoolhouses in Markham.

References
See: C.C. Patterson "Land Settlement in Upper Canada, 1783-1840" in Ontario Archives, Report 1921, and E.A. Cruikshank "An Experiment in Colonization in Upper Canada". In Ontario Historical Society, Papers and Records xxxv, 1929.

Subject matter deals with Simcoe's brilliant idea to employ Berczy's Germans as road builders and creators of an agricultural hinterland for York, just as the old fox Robert Morris had done for Williamsburg, appealed to Berczy because he harbored similar plans.

"Mannheim, the home of man" comes from interviews held with descendants of Berczy settlers, by John Lunau a long-time curator of the Markham Museum, who often made reference to the name Mannheim at public meetings and town conventions.

The Scadding Bridge, named after Simcoe's Estate Administrator, was the first structure of any kind to span the Don River and served to link York with the Kingston Road. It stood near what is now the junction of King and Queen streets in Toronto.

The bridge was designed by William Berczy and was already in use in 1794 for the transport of lumber from Markham to "Muddy York". Original drawings of the bridge are preserved in the National Archive in Ottawa. Also see Canadian Archives Publication 8, 1912, No. 2660.

Don Bridge, sketch by Berczy, is preserved in the Canadian National Archive, Ottawa.

The Russell Abbey was designed by William Berczy and was occupied by Peter Russell.
In Russell's account book are preserved details of the undertaking which started in March 1797 with 22 barrels of lime and 6,500 bricks. - Peter Russell account book for 1797, is in the Public Archives of Ontario, Toronto.

Further reading: Letter by Peter Russell to Simcoe dated December 9, 1797, in Simcoe Papers of the Ontario Archive

The Canadians William Berczy, Florence M. Burns, p. 37 Fitzhenry & Whiteside Limited.

A picture of the Russell Abbey drawing by Henry Scadding is preserved in the Toronto Public Reference Library.

North West Fur Trade - see Henry Scadding "Toronto of Old", Toronto, 1878, p. 450, also Berczy's letter re. warehouse in Unionville.

German Mills Residents Website: http://www.gmra.ca

Also see Genesee Journal p. 186

German-Canadian culture in Ontario
Neighbourhoods in Markham, Ontario
Thornhill, Ontario